Varvara Gennadyevna Masyagina (born 25 August 1977 in Almaty) is a Kazakh judoka, who competed in the women's half-heavyweight category. She picked up five medals in her career, including two silvers each from the 1998 Asian Games in Bangkok, Thailand and the 2003 Asian Judo Championships in Jeju City, South Korea, and later represented her nation Kazakhstan at the 2004 Summer Olympics.

Massyagina qualified for the Kazakh squad in the women's half-heavyweight class (78 kg) at the 2004 Summer Olympics in Athens, by placing third and receiving a berth from the Asian Championships in Almaty. She lost her opening match to a seventeen-year-old U.S. judoka Nicole Kubes, who scored an ippon victory and quickly subdued her on the tatami with a harai makikomi (hip sweep wraparound) at eight seconds.

References

External links
 
 

1977 births
Living people
Kazakhstani female judoka
Olympic judoka of Kazakhstan
Judoka at the 2004 Summer Olympics
Judoka at the 1998 Asian Games
Asian Games medalists in judo
Sportspeople from Almaty
Asian Games silver medalists for Kazakhstan
Medalists at the 1998 Asian Games